So Far is the fourth album by Crosby, Stills & Nash, their third as Crosby, Stills, Nash & Young, and the first compilation album released by the group. Shipping as a gold record and peaking at No. 1 on the Billboard Top Pop Albums chart, it was the band's third chart-topping album in a row. It has been certified six times platinum by the RIAA, and is the second best-selling album by any configuration of the quartet in tandem after their 1970 studio album, Déjà Vu.

Content
The album contains five of the band's six singles to date, omitting "Marrakesh Express", all of which had reached the Top 40. It is the first release on long-playing album of the single "Ohio" as well as its b-side "Find the Cost of Freedom", and the only place both can be found on one compact disc. The other five tracks were taken from the band's two studio albums, Crosby, Stills & Nash and Déjà Vu, although the other singles appear here in their album-length versions and mixes.

The album's 11 studio tracks derived from a group that had only issued 22 to date. Graham Nash later insisted that the group was against the album's release, calling the concoction of a greatest-hits album from two LPs and one non-LP single "absurd". Atlantic Records wished to capitalize on the highly publicized and anticipated reunion tour of Crosby, Stills, Nash & Young in 1974, however, and such was the demand for any new product by the quartet that So Far topped the charts anyway and went gold immediately.

Young appears on only four of the album's 11 songs: "Ohio"; "Find the Cost of Freedom"; "Woodstock"; and "Helpless". He had only appeared on half the tracks of the Déjà Vu LP. The remaining songs without Young, with the exception of "Déjà Vu", also appear on Crosby, Stills & Nash's Greatest Hits compact disc of 2005.

The cover art was painted by the group's friend and colleague Joni Mitchell. The album was reissued on compact disc in 1988 and again in 1995 after being remastered by Joe Gastwirt at Ocean View Digital using the original master tapes. It was reissued yet again, with no apparent additional remastering, on September 30, 2008. The album has been rendered relatively superfluous with the appearance of the Crosby, Stills & Nash box set in 1991, which contains all of these tracks with the exceptions of "Helplessly Hoping", "Woodstock", "Guinnevere", and "Suite: Judy Blue Eyes", which are in either different versions or different mixes.

Track listing

Personnel
 David Crosby – vocals all tracks; rhythm guitar on "Déjà Vu", "Wooden Ships", "Ohio", and "Woodstock"; acoustic guitar on "Guinnevere"
 Stephen Stills – vocals all tracks except "Guinnevere"; acoustic and electric guitars all tracks except "Our House" and "Guinnevere"; piano on "Déjà Vu" and "Helpless"; organ on "Wooden Ships", "Woodstock", and "Suite: Judy Blue Eyes"; bass on "Déjà Vu", "Wooden Ships", "Teach Your Children", and "Suite: Judy Blue Eyes"
 Graham Nash – vocals all tracks; piano on "Woodstock" and "Our House"; acoustic guitar, tambourine on "Teach Your Children"; harpsichord on "Our House"
 Neil Young – vocals on "Ohio", "Find the Cost of Freedom", and "Helpless"; acoustic guitar on "Find the Cost of Freedom" and "Helpless"; electric guitar on "Ohio" and "Woodstock"
Additional personnel
 Greg Reeves – bass on "Woodstock", "Our House", and "Helpless"
 Calvin "Fuzzy" Samuels – bass on "Ohio"
 Dallas Taylor – drums on "Déjà Vu", "Wooden Ships", "Woodstock", "Our House", "Helpless", and "Suite: Judy Blue Eyes"; tambourine on "Teach Your Children"
 Johnny Barbata – drums on "Ohio"
 John Sebastian – harmonica on "Déjà Vu"
 Jerry Garcia – pedal steel guitar on "Teach Your Children"

Charts

Year End Album Charts

Certification

Notes

References

Crosby, Stills, Nash & Young albums
Neil Young compilation albums
1974 compilation albums
Atlantic Records compilation albums
Albums produced by Neil Young
Albums produced by Stephen Stills
Albums produced by David Crosby
Albums produced by Graham Nash
Albums with cover art by Joni Mitchell